Con brio is a concert overture by Jörg Widmann influenced by Beethoven. It is a commission by the Bayerischer Rundfunk.

History
Mariss Jansons said, that the new piece should be performed along with a pure Beethoven program. The overture was composed in 2008. It was written in a "mad hurry".

Music
Widmann refers to musical characteristics of Beethoven’s 7th and 8th Symphony. There are no exact quotations from the symphonies, but he has chosen the same instrumentation. According to Widmann, it is an exercise in fury and rhythmic insistence. In a very small space, a sonata form is presented before the recurring material is arranged into a scherzo. The overture is run through with Beethovenian riffs, flourishes and humor and is like a deconstruction of Beethoven. The piece, full of extended techniques, has a cut-and-paste structure. The timpani are in the focus from the beginning of the overture.

Motif I

Motif II

The metronome markings are deliberately selected at a fast speed. The score contains six dense pages of written instructions.

Instrumentation
The concert overture is scored for 2 flutes (both doubling piccolo), 2 oboes, 2 clarinets in B, 2 bassoons, 2 horns in F, 2 trumpets in B, timpani, and strings.

Performances
Con brio was premiered by the Bavarian Radio Symphony Orchestra conducted by Mariss Jansons on 25 September 2008 in Munich, Gasteig, Philharmonie.

Recordings
 Con brio (with Beethoven: Symphony No. 7 & 8), Mariss Jansons, Bavarian Radio Symphony Orchestra (BR-Klassik 2015)

Reception
Anthony Tommasini from The New York Times wrote: "effective as a warm-up". David Allen from The New York Times wrote: "One of the most performed orchestral works written this century".

References

Compositions by Jörg Widmann
2008 compositions
21st-century classical music
Compositions for symphony orchestra